Pierre-Charles Simart (born in Troyes on 27 June 1806, died in Paris on 27 May 1857) was a French sculptor.

The son of a carpenter from Troyes in Champagne, Simart was the pupil of Antoine Desbœuf, Charles Dupaty, Jean-Pierre Cortot and James Pradier. In 1833, he won the first Prix de Rome for sculpture with a relief Le Vieillard et les enfants.

He was an elected member of the Académie des Beaux-Arts in 1852.

Main works
 La Poésie épique, statue, marble, Paris, Jardin du Luxembourg
 La Philosophie, statue, marble, Paris, Jardin du Luxembourg
 pediment of the Pavillon de l’Horloge, Louvre, Paris, with fellow sculptor Antoine-Louis Barye, 1857
 Statue of Napoleon in coronation robes and reliefs of Napoleon's achievements, Napoleon's tomb at Les Invalides, Paris
 a chryselephantine (gold and ivory) recreation of the Athena Parthenos originally by classical sculptor Phidias, for patron Honoré Théodoric d'Albert de Luynes
 four Hellenic friezes and ten reliefs at the Château de Dampierre, for architect Félix Duban, 1841–1843

References
  Emmanuel Schwartz, Les Sculptures de l'École des Beaux-Arts de Paris. Histoire, doctrines, catalogue, École nationale supérieure des Beaux-Arts, Paris, 2003

External links
  Works by Simart, on Insecula.com
  Works by Simart, on Base Joconde

1806 births
1857 deaths
Members of the Académie des beaux-arts
People from Troyes
Prix de Rome for sculpture
19th-century French sculptors
French male sculptors
19th-century French male artists